This list of botanical gardens and arboretums in Texas is intended to include all significant botanical gardens and arboretums in the U.S. state of Texas

See also
List of botanical gardens and arboretums in the United States

References 

 
Arboreta in Texas
botanical gardens and arboretums in Texas